Hannelore  is a German female given name, which is a combination of two names:

 Hanne, a German and Dutch diminutive or short form of Johanna, itself a feminized form of Iohannes (i.e. John), which means God is gracious.
 Lore, the German short form or diminutive of Eleanore, (i.e. Eleanor), a likely variant of the Latin Aenor, which is an old Germanic name of unknown meaning. There is an Occitan phrase "alia Aenor" meaning the other Aenor and used to distinguish a daughter with the same name of her mother. This became "Eleanore" in Old English.

There is also a variant of the name "Hannalora."

List of people

Athletes
 Hannelore Anke (born 1957), German swimmer
 Hannelore Brenner (born 1963), German Paralympian dressage equestrian
 Hannelore Burosch (born 1947), German handball player
 Hannelore Glaser (born 1933), German alpine skier
 Hannelore Göttlich (born 19??), German rower
 Hannelore Hradez (born 1940), German fencer
 Hannelore Plattner (born 19??), Austrian luger 
 Hannelore Possmoser (born 19??), Austrian luger 
 Hannelore Raepke (born 1935), German sprinter
 Hannelore Weygand (born 1924), German equestrian
 Hannelore Zober (born 1946), German handball player

Performers

 Hannelore Auer (born 1942), Austrian Schlager singer
 Hannelore Bey (born 1941), German prima ballerina 
 Hannelore Bode (born 1941), German operatic soprano
 Hannelore Bollmann (born 1925),  German actress
 Hannelore Elsner (1942–2019), German actress
 Hannelore Hoger (born 1942), German actress and director
 Hannelore Knuts (born 1977), Belgian model
 Hannelore Schroth (1922–1987), German actress

Politicians

 Hannelore Kohl (1933–2001), former German first lady
 Hannelore Kraft (born 1961), German politician
 Hannelore Mensch (born 1937), East German politician
 Hannelore Roedel (born 1957), German politician
 Hannelore Rönsch (born 1942), German politician

Others
 Hannelore Baron (1926–1987), German-American abstract artist 
 Hannelore Jörger-Weichert (born 1942), German chessplayer
 Hannelore Schmatz (1940–1979), German mountaineer
 Hannelore "Loki" Schmidt (1919-2010), German environmentalist and former first lady
 Hannelore Valencak (1929–2004), Austrian physicist, novelist, poet, and children's author

Fictional characters
 Hannelore Ellicott-Chatham, a character in Questionable Content
 Dr. Hannelore von Kamprad, an assassination target in Hitman 2: Silent Assassin

References

German feminine given names